is a railway station on the Sanriku Railway's Rias Line in the village of Noda, Iwate Prefecture, Japan.

Lines
Noda-Tamagawa Station is served by the Rias Line, and is located 147.9 kilometers from the terminus of the line at Miyako Station.

Station layout 
The station  has two opposed side platforms connected by a level crossing. The station is unmanned.

Platforms

Adjacent stations

History
Noda-Tamagawa Station opened on 20 July 1975 as a station on the Japanese National Railways (JNR) Kuji Line. On 1 April 1984, upon the privatization of the Kuji Line, the station came under the control of the Sanriku Railway. Following the 11 March 2011 Tōhoku earthquake and tsunami, services on a portion of the Sanriku Railway were suspended. The portion from Rikuchū-Noda to Tanohata resumed operations on 1 April 2012. Minami-Rias Line, a section of Yamada Line, and Kita-Rias Line constitute Rias Line on 23 March 2019. Accordingly, this station became an intermediate station of Rias Line.

Surrounding area
National Route 45

See also
 List of railway stations in Japan

References

External links

  

Railway stations in Iwate Prefecture
Railway stations in Japan opened in 1975
Rias Line
Noda, Iwate